Hyatt Regency Paris – Charles de Gaulle is a 4 star hotel inaugurated in 1992, located close to the Paris Charles de Gaulle international airport and Villepinte exhibition center. It belongs to the American hotel company Hyatt.

Presentation
Hyatt Regency Paris – Charles de Gaulle hotel has 388 guestrooms and suites with original works of art by Denis Rival and James Hull, two restaurants each equipped with an open kitchen, a convention center, a fitness center and two outdoor tennis courts.
The hotel was designed by German architect Helmut Jahn. The lobby opens onto a large 21 metre high glass atrium. It hosts the Cosmos bar and the main hotel restaurant, the Apollo, with a contemporary design and Asian influences, connected by a bamboo-lined path. In the center of this area is the hotel emblem, the “untitled” statue made by Canadian sculptor Evan Penn.

Location
Hyatt Regency Paris – Charles de Gaulle is located between the international Paris Charles de Gaulle airport and Villepinte exhibition center.
It is accessible by the A1, A3 and A4 motorways.

External links
Official website

Hotels in France
Hotel buildings completed in 1992
Hyatt Hotels and Resorts